The Centre des Archives Nationales are the national archives in Beirut, Lebanon.

See also 
 List of national archives

References

External links 
 Official website

Lebanon
Archives in Lebanon